The 2015 GFA Premier Division was the 33rd season of top-division football in Grenada. The competition began on 23 May 2015 and concluded on 24 October 2015. The league title was won by Carib Hurricane who achieved a record-tying fourth title. It was also their first title since 2008.

Teams
A total of 10 teams are taking part in the league. The three newcomers were New Hampshire United, Chantimelle, and Boca Juniors, who finished atop the 2014 GFA First Division table. These clubs replaced the relegated Mount Rich, Happy Hill and Five Stars. Half of the clubs were located in the capital area (St. George's) while the rest were dispersed among the northern tracts of the main island.

Table

Results

Relegation playoffs 
The relegation/promotion playoffs took place between the 8th placed GFA Premier Division club, and the 3rd placed GFA First Division club. 

1–1 on aggregate. Fontenoy United won 4–3 on penalties and remain in the GFA Premier Division

References

External links 

2015
Grenada
Grenada
football